Dmytro Andriyovych Lytvyn (born 21 November 1996) is a Ukrainian professional footballer who plays as a defender for Faroese club KÍ Klaksvík.

Career
Lytvyn is a product of Dynamo Kyiv, Arsenal Kyiv and Metalist Kharkiv youth sportive school systems and spent some years in the Ukrainian Premier League Reserves. In July 2015 he signed a two-year contract with Portuguese club Aves.

References

External links 
 
 

1996 births
Living people
People from Myronivka
Ukrainian footballers
Ukraine under-21 international footballers
Association football defenders
FC Metalist Kharkiv players
C.D. Aves players
Liga Portugal 2 players
AD Fafe players
Real S.C. players
FC Zorya Luhansk players
FC Olimpik Donetsk players
FC Akron Tolyatti players
FC SKA-Khabarovsk players
KÍ Klaksvík players
Ukrainian Premier League players
Russian First League players
Ukrainian expatriate footballers
Expatriate footballers in Portugal
Ukrainian expatriate sportspeople in Portugal
Expatriate footballers in Russia
Ukrainian expatriate sportspeople in Russia
Expatriate footballers in the Faroe Islands
Ukrainian expatriate sportspeople in the Faroe Islands
Sportspeople from Kyiv Oblast